Urdland Station is a railway station on the Bergen Line.  It is located at Urdland in the Raundalen valley, in the municipality of Voss, Vestland county, Norway. The station is served by the Bergen Commuter Rail, operated by Vy Tog, with up to five daily departures in each direction. The station was opened in 1908.

External links
 Jernbaneverket's page on Urdland

Railway stations in Voss
Railway stations on Bergensbanen
Railway stations opened in 1908